Kim Gyu Dae (born 17 January 1984) is a Paralympic athlete from South Korea who competes in T54 track and field events.

Athletics career
Kim, who is classified as a T54 classification wheelchair racer, first represented South Korea at the Summer Paralympics at the 2008 Games in Beijing, competing as part of the South Korea relay team in the 4 × 100 m and the 4 × 400 m, and in the individual 200 metres and 400 metres. He won a single medal, bronze in the 100 metre relay. Four years later, at the 2012 Summer Paralympics in London he won a second bronze medal, this time an individual success in the 1500 m (T54).

As well as Paralympic success, Kim won three medals at the 2013 IPC Athletics World Championships, in Lyon, the most notable of which was his gold in the 800 metres (T54).

Personal history
Kim was born in Tongyeong, South Korea in 1984. In 2004 whilst training for the South Korean UDT/SEAL, he suffered permanent spinal injuries during parachute training.

References 

Paralympic athletes of South Korea
Athletes (track and field) at the 2008 Summer Paralympics
Athletes (track and field) at the 2012 Summer Paralympics
1984 births
Living people
People with paraplegia
Paralympic bronze medalists for South Korea
Medalists at the 2008 Summer Paralympics
Medalists at the 2012 Summer Paralympics
South Korean male middle-distance runners
South Korean male sprinters
South Korean wheelchair racers
Sportspeople from South Gyeongsang Province
Medalists at the 2016 Summer Paralympics
Paralympic medalists in athletics (track and field)
21st-century South Korean people